Niederlauer is a municipality  in the district of Rhön-Grabfeld in Bavaria in Germany. The rivers Franconian Saale and Lauer flow through the village.

References

Rhön-Grabfeld